Colletes daviesanus  is a Palearctic species of  plasterer bee.

References

External links
Images representing Colletes daviesanus

Hymenoptera of Europe
Colletidae
Insects described in 1846